Okoroire (Maori: Ōkoroire) is a small settlement in the South Waikato District and Waikato region of New Zealand's North Island, centered around the Okoroire Hot Springs. The place name means 'place of the koroire / toroire, an extinct species of ring-necked duck.

The hot springs consist of three naturally heated geothermal pools dug in 1880, which were extensively redeveloped in 2017 and 2018. The pools are surrounded by bush and ferns. During the late 19th century the pools were used by the sick for treatment and by Māori women to cleanse after giving birth.

Local attractions include whitewater rafting, bird-watching and fishing. Local walks include the Three Kauri Track, the Wairere Falls walk and Te Waihou walkway.

Okoroire Hotel, a historic country pub built in 1889 from ancient-timber, is located nearby near the banks of the Waihou River. It has been owned by the same family for three generations. The hotel was sold to a Chinese business in 2014. It made staff cutbacks in 2018.

In 2016, members of the Chiefs rugby team were accused of exposing themselves to a stripper during an end-of-season event at the hot springs.

Education

Railway station 
In 1890 it had no shelter shed, or siding, but by 1896 the station had a shelter shed, platform, cart approach and urinals. A caretaker was appointed in 1913 and a longer platform and an addition to the shelter shed were made in 1917. The station closed to passengers on 31 July 1962, to all traffic except stock from 18 August 1968 and to stock on Monday 1 June 1970. Only a single track and a plantation remains.

References

South Waikato District
Populated places in Waikato